Delbar Sadat (also Romanized as Delbar Sādāt; also known as Delbar Sādāt-e ‘Olyā, Delbar, Kaduney-e Olya, and Kādūnī-e ‘Olyā) is a village in Veysian Rural District, Veysian District, Dowreh County, Lorestan Province, Iran. At the 2006 census, its population was 227, in 54 families.

References 

Towns and villages in Dowreh County